The axiom of constructibility is a possible axiom for set theory in mathematics that asserts that every set is constructible. The axiom is usually written as V = L, where V and L denote the von Neumann universe and the constructible universe, respectively. The axiom, first investigated by Kurt Gödel, is inconsistent with the proposition that zero sharp exists and stronger large cardinal axioms (see list of large cardinal properties). Generalizations of this axiom are explored in inner model theory.

Implications 
The axiom of constructibility implies the axiom of choice (AC), given Zermelo–Fraenkel set theory without the axiom of choice (ZF).  It also settles many natural mathematical questions that are independent of Zermelo–Fraenkel set theory with the axiom of choice (ZFC); for example, the axiom of constructibility implies the generalized continuum hypothesis, the negation of Suslin's hypothesis, and the existence of an analytical (in fact) non-measurable set of real numbers, all of which are independent of ZFC.

The axiom of constructibility implies the non-existence of those large cardinals with consistency strength greater or equal to 0#, which includes some "relatively small" large cardinals. For example, no cardinal can be ω1-Erdős in L.  While L does contain the initial ordinals of those large cardinals (when they exist in a supermodel of L), and they are still initial ordinals in L, it excludes the auxiliary structures (e.g. measures) which endow those cardinals with their large cardinal properties.

Although the axiom of constructibility does resolve many set-theoretic questions, it is not typically accepted as an axiom for set theory in the same way as the ZFC axioms. Among set theorists of a realist bent, who believe that the axiom of constructibility is either true or false, most believe that it is false. This is in part because it seems unnecessarily "restrictive", as it allows only certain subsets of a given set (for example,  can't exist), with no clear reason to believe that these are all of them. In part it is because the axiom is contradicted by sufficiently strong large cardinal axioms. This point of view is especially associated with the Cabal, or the "California school" as Saharon Shelah would have it.

In arithmetic 
Especially from the 1950s to the 1970s, there have been some investigations into formulating an analogue of the axiom of constructibility for subsystems of second-order arithmetic. A few results stand out in the study of such analogues:

 Addison's  formula  such that  iff , i.e.  is a constructible real

 There's a  formula known as the "analytical form of the axiom of constructibility" which has some associations to the set-theoretic axiom V=L. For example, some cases where  iff  have been given.

Significance 
The major significance of the axiom of constructibility is in Kurt Gödel's proof of the relative consistency of the axiom of choice and the generalized continuum hypothesis to Von Neumann–Bernays–Gödel set theory.  (The proof carries over to Zermelo–Fraenkel set theory, which has become more prevalent in recent years.)

Namely Gödel proved that  is relatively consistent (i.e. if  can prove a contradiction, then so can ), and that in 

thereby establishing that AC and GCH are also relatively consistent.

Gödel's proof was complemented in later years by Paul Cohen's result that both AC and GCH are independent, i.e. that the negations of these axioms ( and ) are also relatively consistent to ZF set theory.

Statements true in L 

Here is a list of propositions that hold in the constructible universe (denoted by L):

 The generalized continuum hypothesis and as a consequence
 The axiom of choice
 Diamondsuit
 Clubsuit
 Global square
 The existence of morasses
 The negation of the Suslin hypothesis
 The non-existence of 0# and as a consequence
 The non existence of all large cardinals which imply the existence of a measurable cardinal
 The truth of Whitehead's conjecture that every abelian group A with Ext1(A, Z) = 0 is a free abelian group.
 The existence of a definable well-order of all sets (the formula for which can be given explicitly).  In particular, L satisfies V=HOD.
 The existence of a primitive recursive class surjection , i.e. a class function from Ord whose range contains all sets. 

Accepting the axiom of constructibility (which asserts that every set is constructible) these propositions also hold in the von Neumann universe, resolving many propositions in set theory and some interesting questions in analysis.

References

External links 
 How many real numbers are there?, Keith Devlin, Mathematical Association of America, June 2001

Axioms of set theory
Constructible universe